Masochism is the enjoyment of receiving pain or humiliation.

Masochism may also refer to:

 Sexual masochism disorder, a medical condition in which pain or humiliation is required for sexual arousal and causes distress or impairment
 Masochism (album), an upcoming studio album by Sky Ferreira
 "Masochism", a song by Sega Bodega from Salvador
 Masochism: Coldness and Cruelty, a 1967 book by Gilles Deleuze
 Masochism: Current Psychoanalytic Perspectives, a 1993 book by Robert Glick and Donald Meyers

See also
 
 Masochist (disambiguation)